David Johnstone (1734–1824) was a Church of Scotland minister who served almost 60 years as minister of North Leith Parish Church. He was Chaplain in Ordinary to King George IV in Scotland.

Life

He was born in Arngask manse, near Glenfarg on 26 April 1734 the second son of Rev John Johnstone the local minister. He was the maternal grandson of Rev David Williamson of St Cuthbert's Church in Edinburgh (aka "Dainty Davie").

He studied at Edinburgh University and was licensed to preach by the Presbytery of Selkirk in July 1757.

He was ordained as minister of Langton in May 1758. He was presented to the congregation of North Leith in 1764 and officially became minister of North Leith Parish Church in July 1765. He remained minister of the church until his death.

In 1793, with Rev Thomas Blacklock he co-founded the Blind Asylum in Edinburgh. The original structure being at 58 Nicolson Street in Edinburgh. a second female building was opened in 1822 at 38 Nicolson Street. In the same year he was created Chaplain in Ordinary to King George III. For the latter role the King offered him a knighthood in 1812 but he declined this offer.

In 1815, when the new North Leith Parish Church was built around 1 km to the south-west, on Madeira Street, although preaching at the new church, he refused to leave his home in the old manse, which was built integral with the church. This frustrated redevelopment, resulting in the odd mox which now exists: a rebuilt structure to the west which was built as a mill in 1825, the manse of 1600, remodelled in 1720 and the church spire of 1675.

He died in North Leith manse on 5 July 1824. He is buried in the small nearby graveyard on Coburg Street.

Family
In July 1759 he married Elizabeth Todd (1735-1796) daughter of John Todd a Leith shipbuilder. Their children included:

Lt John Johnstone HEICS (1761-1786) died on service in Bombay
Gavin (1762-1773)
Robert (1767-1768)
Margaret (1769-1770)
David (1770-1771)
Henrietta (1772-1785)
David (1773-1775)
Elizabeth (1775-1869) married the Glasgow merchant William Penney
Jane (1777-1818) married Robert MacBriar of Glasgow

Gladstone

Thomas Gladstones was Treasurer of the Kirk Session under Johnstone and a close friend. His son John Gladstone was a member of the congregation and Rev Johnstone took a very strong interest in his career.

Gladstones owned the land facing the church across the Water of Leith: living on King Street and with premises on Coalhill.

Publications

Dissertation on the Encouragement which Our Blessed Lord Gave to Little Children (1799)

Artistic recognition

A marble bust of Rev Johnston stands in the vestibule of the current North Leith Parish Church.

References
 

1734 births
1824 deaths
People from Perthshire
18th-century Ministers of the Church of Scotland
19th-century Ministers of the Church of Scotland